The 2019 Duke Blue Devils football team represented Duke University in the 2019 NCAA Division I FBS football season s a member of the Atlantic Coast Conference (ACC) in the Coastal Division. The team was led by head coach David Cutcliffe, in his 12th year, and played its home games at Wallace Wade Stadium in Durham, North Carolina. They finished the season 5–7 overall and 3–5 in ACC play to place sixth in the Coastal Division.

Preseason

Preseason media poll
In the preseason ACC media poll, Duke was predicted to finish in fifth in the Coastal Division.

Schedule

Personnel

Coaching staff

Game summaries

vs. Alabama

North Carolina A&T

at Middle Tennessee

at Virginia Tech

Pittsburgh

Georgia Tech

at Virginia

at North Carolina

Notre Dame

Syracuse

at Wake Forest

Miami (FL)

References

Duke
Duke Blue Devils football seasons
Duke Blue Devils football